Aleksandar Srdić (born 30 May 1992) is a Serbian football winger who plays for Swiss club FC Freienbach.

Career
Born in Trebišov, Czechoslovakia (now Slovakia), he played in Serbian lower-league sides Radnički Beograd, BASK and PKB Padinska Skela before moving to Slovenian side Celje during the winter break of the 2012–13 season.  He played with Celje in the Slovenian First League until the following winter-break of the 2013–14 season when he moved to Greece and played the rest of the season with Serres in the Greek Football League (second league).  In summer 2014 he moved to Romania and joined Săgeata Năvodari playing in the Liga II.  During the winter break of the 2014–15 season he returned to Serbia and joined Mačva Šabac paying in Serbian second-tier.

Ahead of the 2019–20 season, Srdić joined Swiss club FC Freienbach from FC Regensdorf.

Honours
BASK
 Serbian First League: 2010–11

References

External links
 
 

1992 births
Living people
Sportspeople from Trebišov
Association football wingers
Serbian footballers
FK Radnički Beograd players
FK BASK players
FK Mačva Šabac players
Serbian expatriate footballers
Serbian expatriate sportspeople in Slovenia
Expatriate footballers in Slovenia
Slovenian PrvaLiga players
NK Celje players
NK Aluminij players
Serbian expatriate sportspeople in Greece
Expatriate footballers in Greece
Serbian expatriate sportspeople in Romania
Expatriate footballers in Romania
Serbian expatriate sportspeople in Switzerland
Expatriate footballers in Switzerland
AFC Săgeata Năvodari players